James, Jim, or Jimmy Simpson may refer to:

Politicians
 James Simpson (Canadian politician) (1873–1938), Canadian trade unionist and mayor of Toronto (1935)
 James Simpson (Ugandan politician) (1908–1994), Minister of Economic Affairs in the first Cabinet of Uganda
 James Simpson Jr. (1905–1960), U.S. Representative from Illinois
 Jim Simpson (Australian politician) (1905–1968), member of the New South Wales Legislative Assembly

Sportspeople
 Jimmy Simpson (footballer, born 1873) (1873–?), Scottish footballer
 Jimmy Simpson (American football) (1897–1979), blocking back in the National Football League
 Jimmy Simpson (motorcyclist) (1898–1981), British motorcycle racer
 Jimmy Simpson (footballer, born 1908) (1908–1972), Scottish footballer
 Jimmy Simpson (footballer, born 1923) (1923–2010), English footballer
 Jim Simpson (sportscaster) (1927–2016), American sportscaster
 Jim Simpson (footballer, born 1959), Scottish footballer
 Jimmy Simpson (racing driver) (born 1992), American racing driver
 Jimmy Simpson (North Carolinian racing driver), American racing driver

Other people
 James Simpson (advocate) (1781–1853), Scottish advocate and author
 James Simpson (Scottish architect) (1830-1894) 
 James Simpson (British Army officer) (1792–1868), general of the British Army
 James Simpson (civil servant) (c. 1792–1857), early Australian civil servant and property developer
 James Simpson (engineer) (1799–1869), president of the Institution of Civil Engineers, 1853–1855
 James Young Simpson (1811–1870), Scottish surgeon and pioneer in use of chloroform as anaesthetic
 James H. Simpson (1813–1883), surveyor of the American West for the U.S. Army.
 James Young Simpson (minister) (c. 1843–1898), Methodist minister in South Australia; nephew of the surgeon
 James Simpson (priest) (1865–1948), Dean of Peterborough (1928–1942)
 James Young Simpson (diplomat) (1873–1934), Scottish professor of natural science and a diplomat; great nephew of the surgeon
 James Simpson (explorer) (1911–2002), polar explorer
 James B. Simpson (1927–2002), American journalist and Episcopal priest, known for Simpson's Contemporary Quotations
 James E Simpson Jr (1928–1999), Kentucky politician
 James Jenkins Simpson, British entomologist and marine biologist
 James Simpson (academic) (born 1954), Australian academic
 James Simpson (minister) (fl. 1970s–1990s), Moderator of the General Assembly of the Church of Scotland
 Jimmi Simpson (born 1975), American actor
 James Simpson (government official) (fl. 2010s), New Jersey Department of Transportation commissioner and former Federal Transit Administrator for the United States DOT
 Jimbo Simpson (?–2018), Northern Irish paramilitary
 James Alexander Simpson (1805–1880), American painter

See also
 James Simson (1740–1770),  medical academic
 James Simson (surgeon) (1795–1876), Edinburgh surgeon
 Jamie Simpson (born 1986), Australian rugby league coach with the Central Queensland Capras